Arthur 'Wicker' Surridge (1884–1963) was a rugby league footballer in the Australian competition the New South Wales Rugby Football League premiership between 1909 and 1910.

Playing career
An Easts rugby junior, Surridge grew up at Paddington, New South Wales and  played for the Eastern Suburbs club in the 1909 NSWRFL season. A forward, Surridge was an accomplished goal kicker, playing in 9 matches for the Tricolours, including that year's semifinal loss to Balmain in which he was a try scorer.

Surridge represented the New South Wales rugby league team on four occasions in 1909. He is noted as the 31st Eastern Suburbs player. He joined Balmain for the 1910 NSWRFL season.

Surridge was a well-known police detective in Sydney and held numerous positions with the Eastern Suburbs club over many years. He died on 2 August 1963, aged 79 years.

References

External links
 The Encyclopedia Of Rugby League Players; Alan Whiticker & Glen Hudson
 History Of The New South Wales Rugby League; Steve Haddan

1884 births
1963 deaths
Australian rugby league players
Balmain Tigers players
Rugby league players from Sydney
Sydney Roosters players